IX may refer to:
 IX, the Roman numeral for the number 9

IX or Ix may also refer to:

Arts and entertainment

Music
 IX (...And You Will Know Us by the Trail of Dead album)
 IX (Bulldozer album)
 IX (Corrosion of Conformity album)
 IX, used as a logo by the band Ice Nine Kills
 IX, the first song off of Trivium's album What the Dead Men Say

Literature
 iX (magazine), a German monthly computer magazine
 Ix (Dune), a fictional planet in Frank Herbert's Dune
 Ix (Oz), a fictional country in Queen Zixi of Ix by L. Frank Baum
 Ix, the central governmental supercomputer in Omikron: The Nomad Soul
 Ix, the nickname of Ford Prefect from the Hitchhiker's Guide to the Galaxy by Douglas Adams

Other media
 Ix, the primary antagonist of Sonic Chronicles: The Dark Brotherhood
IX, a map in zombies mode (chaos storyline) of Call of Duty Black Ops 4
IX, an entity from the video game Destiny 2

Other uses
 IxD, interaction design
 Internet exchange point
 Air India Express (IATA airline code IX), budget arm of Air India
 Noveschi, an oligarchy ruling Siena, Italy during the late Middle Ages
 Ix, the 14th day in the Tzolk'in calendar
 Ix Chel, Maya jaguar goddess
 Ix Ek' Naah, Maya queen
defunct Flandre Air (IATA airline code IX)
 IX, the United States Navy hull classification for an unclassified miscellaneous vessel
 iX, the short name of iXsystems
 BMW iX, an electric sport utility vehicle
 I-X Center or International Exposition Center in Cleveland, Ohio, U.S.